
Gmina Lubrza is a rural gmina (administrative district) in Świebodzin County, Lubusz Voivodeship, in western Poland.

Villages
Gmina Lubrza contains the villages and settlements of Boryszyn, Bucze, Buczyna, Chałupczyn, Dolisko, Janisławiec, Laski, Lubrza, Mostki, Mrówczyn, Nowa Wioska, Przełazy, Romanówek, Staropole, Tyczyno, Zagaje and Zagórze.

Neighbouring gminas
Gmina Lubrza is bordered by the gminas of Łagów, Międzyrzecz, Skąpe, Sulęcin and Świebodzin.

Twin towns – sister cities

Gmina Lubrza is twinned with:
 Burg, Germany
 Neuenkirchen, Germany

References

Lubrza
Gmina Lubrza